Barbora Kodedová (born 27 February 1990) is a Czech modern pentathlete. She has qualified for 2016 Summer Olympics. She is coached by Libor Capalini, Jan Miňo, Robert Kopecký.

References

External links 
 

1990 births
Living people
Czech female modern pentathletes
Modern pentathletes at the 2016 Summer Olympics
Olympic modern pentathletes of the Czech Republic
Sportspeople from Plzeň